Zirkan or Zir Kan, is the name of two villages in Iran:
 Zirkan, East Azerbaijan (زيركان - Zīrkān)
 Zirkan, Razavi Khorasan (زيركن - Zīrkan)